Biratchowk  is a town in Sundar Haraicha, Morang District in the Koshi Zone of south-eastern Nepal which is considered as the emerging city in Morang District. Lying on the east-west highway, Biratchowk is the gateway to Biratnagar, the headquarter of Morang district. It is the fastest-growing town in eastern Nepal. 
It is the center of Sundar Haraicha Municipality. Sundar Haraicha municipality office is located in the heart of Biratchowk.

Biratchowk is one of the most expensive places in eastern Nepal. With the soaring cost of real estate, the city has surpassed even the capital city of Nepal, Kathmandu when it comes to the cost of the property. Nepal's first search engine Niriv was founded in Biratchowk in July 2021.

People here are cordial and welcoming towards immigrants from all around the country. A huge inflow of migrants from the nearby hilly regions during the Maoist insurgency in Nepal has resulted in the town becoming a melting pot of different cultures. A rich tapestry of diverse cultures, cuisine, and religion has made this town a vibrant place to live.

References

External links

Sundar Haraicha Municipality
Nepal municipalities established in 2014